NFPA 921, "Guide for Fire and Explosion Investigations", is a peer reviewed document that is published by the National Fire Protection Association (NFPA).   Its purpose is "to establish guidelines and recommendations for the safe and systematic investigation or analysis of fire and explosion incidents" (section 1.2.1). Familiarity with NFPA 921 is strongly recommended by National Association of Fire Investigators and the International Association of Arson Investigators (IAAI). NFPA 921 forms a large basis of the information which a professional fire investigator must know to pass the various Fire Investigator Certification (NAFI and IAAI) examinations.

While not every recommendation in NFPA 921 will apply to any particular fire or explosion investigation, the document itself recommends that if a particular fire investigator does not apply certain sections to an investigation where they are called-for, the investigator must be prepared to justify the exclusion.

This standard was long resisted in legal circles, with civil and criminal arson investigations leading to convictions later proven wrongful, such as that of Cameron Todd Willingham.

See also
 Fire investigation
 National Fire Protection Association (NFPA)
 Kirk's Fire Investigation

External links

References

Fire investigation
Safety organizations
Firefighting in the United States
NFPA Standards